Nifu Haruna, also known by his stage name WizzyPro is a Nigerian record producer and sound engineer. Best known for his single titled "Emergency", WizzyPro is credited as the producer of Patoranking's first official single titled "Alubarika" which brought him to limelight. WizzyPro is signed to BeatBox and is currently working on his debut studio album titled Lord of the Sound.

Production discography

Awards and nominations

References

Living people
Nigerian record producers
People from Kogi State
Hip hop record producers
Year of birth missing (living people)